The Book of Nephi: Who Is the Son of Nephi—One of the Disciples of Jesus Christ, usually referred to as Fourth Nephi or 4 Nephi, is one of the fifteen books that make up the Book of Mormon. This book was first called "IV Nephi" in the 1879 edition and "Fourth Nephi" in the 1920 edition of Book of Mormon.

Fourth Nephi is among the shorter books in the Book of Mormon, containing only a single chapter, but it covers almost three centuries of the history of the Nephites and the Lamanites (ca AD 35 to 321).

The book describes the period of time immediately following the visit of Jesus Christ to the Book of Mormon peoples, in which time the Nephites and the Lamanites are all converted to the Church of Christ. The Nephites stopped obeying the law of Moses and obeyed the commandments of Jesus instead. After the year AD 100, all the original disciples of Jesus had died, except for three which he allowed to live on and on until the end of human history. But new disciples were ordained to replace the ones that died.  According to the record, "surely there could not be a happier people among all the people who had been created by the hand of God" (4 Ne. 1:16). During this time the distinction between the Lamanites and Nephites disappears: "neither were there Lamanites, nor any manner of -ites; but they were in one, the children of Christ, and heirs to the kingdom of God" (4 Ne. 1:17).

The Nephi who recorded the coming of Jesus to America died, and the keeping of the plates passed to his son Amos.  After that, the people started to get rich, and wear expensive clothing and jewelry, and divide themselves into rich and poor, and the communal sharing of private property came to an end. Then they formed churches which were really businesses for the purpose of gaining profits.

One of these churches began to persecute members of the True Church of Christ, casting them into prison (but the prison then broke in two), or casting them into fiery furnaces (but the victims walked out unscathed), or casting them into a lion's den (but the victims played with the animals as if they were lambs). "And they did smite upon the people of Jesus; but the people of Jesus did not smite again."

The people once again divided into Nephites and Lamanites, and although the Nephites remain righteous longer than the Lamanites, by AD 300, "both the people of Nephi and the Lamanites had become exceedingly wicked one like unto another" (4 Ne. 1:45).

The book concludes with Ammaron hiding the sacred records, which he ultimately delivered to Mormon.

References

Further reading

External links
 The Book of Mormon: Fourth Nephi

Nephi4